Cyrtodactylus irianjayaensis  is a species of gecko that is endemic to Papua New Guinea.

References 

Cyrtodactylus
Reptiles described in 2001